The lithium–sulfur battery (Li–S battery) is a type of rechargeable battery. It is notable for its high specific energy. The low atomic weight of lithium and moderate atomic weight of sulfur means that Li–S batteries are relatively light (about the density of water). They were used on the longest and highest-altitude unmanned solar-powered aeroplane flight (at the time) by Zephyr 6 in August 2008.

Lithium–sulfur batteries may displace lithium-ion cells because of their higher energy density and reduced cost. This is due to the use of sulfur instead of  cobalt, a common element in lithium-ion batteries. Li–S batteries offer specific energies on the order of 550Wh/kg, while lithium-ion batteries are in the range of 150260Wh/kg.

Li–S batteries with up to 1,500 charge and discharge cycles were demonstrated in 2017, but cycle life tests at commercial scale and with lean electrolyte have not been completed. As of early 2021, none were commercially available.

Issues that have slowed acceptance include the polysulfide "shuttle" effect that is responsible for the progressive leakage of active material from the cathode, resulting in too-few recharge cycles. Also, sulfur cathodes have low conductivity, requiring extra mass for a conducting agent in order to exploit the contribution of active mass to the capacity. Volume expansion of the sulfur cathode during S to LiS conversion and the large amount of electrolyte needed are also issues.

History 
LiS batteries were invented in the 1960s, when Herbert and Ulam patented a primary battery employing lithium or lithium alloys as anodic material, sulfur as cathodic material and an electrolyte composed of aliphatic saturated amines. A few years later the technology was improved by the introduction of organic solvents as PC, DMSO and DMF yielding a 2.35-2.5 V battery. By the end of the 1980s a rechargeable LiS battery was demonstrated employing ethers, in particular DOL, as the electrolyte solvent.

In 2020 Manthiram identified the critical parameters needed for achieving commercial acceptance. Specifically, Li-S batteries need to achieve a sulfur loading of >5 mg cm−2, a carbon content of <5%, electrolyte-to-sulfur ratio of <5 μL mg−1, electrolyte-to-capacity ratio of <5 μL (mA h)−1, and negative-to-positive capacity ratio of <5 in pouch-type cells.

In 2021, researchers announced the use of a sugar-based anode additive that prevented the release of polysulfide chains from the cathodes that pollute the anode. A prototype cell demonstrated 1,000 charge cycles with a capacity of 700 mAh/g.

In 2022, an interlayer was introduced that claimed to reduce polysulfide movement (protecting the anode) and facilitate lithium ion transfer to reduce charge/discharge times. Also that year, researchers employed aramid nanofibers (nanoscale Kevlar fibers), fashioned into cell membrane-like networks. This prevented dendrite formation. It addressed polysulfide shuttle by using ion selectivity, by integrating tiny channels into the network and adding an electrical charge.

Also in 2022, Researchers at Drexel University produced a prototype lithium-sulfur battery that did not degrade over 4000 charge cycles. Analysis has shown that the battery contained monoclinic gamma-phase sulfur, which has been thought to be unstable below 95 degrees Celsius, and only a few studies have shown this type of sulfur to be stable longer than 20 to 30 minutes.

Chemistry
Chemical processes in the Li–S cell include lithium dissolution from the anode surface (and incorporation into alkali metal polysulfide salts) during discharge, and reverse lithium plating to the anode while charging.

Anode 
At the anodic surface, dissolution of the metallic lithium occurs, with the production of electrons and lithium ions during the discharge and electrodeposition during the charge. The half-reaction is expressed as:

Li <=> Li+ + e-

In analogy with lithium batteries, the dissolution / electrodeposition reaction causes over time problems of unstable growth of the solid-electrolyte interface (SEI), generating active sites for the nucleation and dendritic growth of lithium. Dendritic growth is responsible for the internal short circuit in lithium batteries and leads to the death of the battery itself.

Cathode 
In Li-S batteries, energy is stored in the sulfur cathode (S8). During discharge, the lithium ions in the electrolyte migrate to the cathode where the sulfur is reduced to lithium sulphide (Li2S). The sulfur is reoxidized to S8 during the recharge phase. The semi-reaction is therefore expressed as:

S + 2Li+ + 2e-  <=>  Li2S    (E ° ≈ 2.15 V vs Li / Li+ )

Actually the sulfur reduction reaction to lithium sulphide is much more complex and involves the formation of lithium polysulphides (Li2Sx, 2 ≤ x ≤ 8) at decreasing chain length according to the order:

Li2S8->Li2S6->Li2S4->Li2S2->Li2S

The final product is actually a mixture of Li2S2 and Li2S rather than pure Li2S, due to the slow reduction kinetics at Li2S. This contrasts with conventional lithium-ion cells, where the lithium ions are intercalated in the anode and cathodes. Each sulfur atom can host two lithium ions. Typically, lithium-ion batteries accommodate only 0.5–0.7 lithium ions per host atom. Consequently, LiS allows for a much higher lithium storage density. Polysulfides are reduced on the cathode surface in sequence while the cell is discharging:
 →  →  →  → 
Across a porous diffusion separator, sulfur polymers form at the cathode as the cell charges:

These reactions are analogous to those in the sodium–sulfur battery.

The main challenges of LiS batteries is the low conductivity of sulfur and its considerable volume change upon discharging and finding a suitable cathode is the first step for commercialization of LiS batteries. Therefore, most researchers use a carbon/sulfur cathode and a lithium anode. Sulfur is very cheap, but has practically no electroconductivity, 5S⋅cm−1 at 25°C. A carbon coating provides the missing electroconductivity. Carbon nanofibers provide an effective electron conduction path and structural integrity, at the disadvantage of higher cost.

One problem with the lithium–sulfur design is that when the sulfur in the cathode absorbs lithium, volume expansion of the LixS compositions occurs, and predicted volume expansion of Li2S is nearly 80% of the volume of the original sulfur. This causes large mechanical stresses on the cathode, which is a major cause of rapid degradation. This process reduces the contact between the carbon and the sulfur, and prevents the flow of lithium ions to the carbon surface.

Mechanical properties of the lithiated sulfur compounds are strongly contingent on the lithium content, and with increasing lithium content, the strength of lithiated sulfur compounds improves, although this increment is not linear with lithiation.

One of the primary shortfalls of most Li–S cells is unwanted reactions with the electrolytes. Dissolving  into electrolytes causes irreversible loss of active sulfur. Use of highly reactive lithium as a negative electrode causes dissociation of most of the commonly used other type electrolytes. Use of a protective layer in the anode surface has been studied to improve cell safety, i.e., using Teflon coating showed improvement in the electrolyte stability, LIPON, Li3N also exhibited promising performance.

Polysulfide "shuttle"   
Historically, the "shuttle" effect is the main cause of degradation in a LiS battery. The lithium polysulfide Li2Sx (6≤x≤8) is highly soluble in the common electrolytes used for LiS batteries. 
They are formed and leaked from the cathode and they diffuse to the anode, where they are reduced to short-chain polysulfides and diffuse back to the cathode where long-chain polysulfides are formed again. This process results in the continuous leakage of active material from the cathode, lithium corrosion, low coulombic efficiency and low battery life. 
Moreover, the "shuttle" effect is responsible for the characteristic self-discharge of LiS batteries, because of slow dissolution of polysulfide, which occurs also in rest state. The "shuttle" effect in a LiS battery can be quantified by a factor  fc (0<fc<1), evaluated by the extension of the charge voltage plateau. The factor fc is given by the expression:

where ks, qup, [Stot] and Ic are respectively the kinetic constant, specific capacity contributing to the anodic plateau, the total sulfur concentration and charge current.

In 2022, researchers reported the use of a cathode made from carbon nanofibers. Elemental sulfur was deposited onto the carbon substrate (cf. physical vapor deposition), which formed the rare and usually metastable monoclinic γ-Sulfur allotrope. This allotrope reversibly reacts to  without the formation of intermediate polysulfides . Therefore, carbonate electrolytes, which commonly react with those polysulfides, can be used instead of the rather dangerous ether based electrolytes (low flash and boiling points).

Its initial capacity was 800 Ah/kg (classical LiCoO2/graphite batteries have a cell capacity of 100 Ah/kg). It decayed only very slowly, on average 0.04% each cycle, and retained 658 Ah/kg after 4000 cycles (82%).

Electrolyte 
Conventionally, LiS batteries employ a liquid organic electrolyte, contained in the pores of PP separator. The electrolyte plays a key role in LiS batteries, acting both on "shuttle" effect by the polysulfide dissolution and the SEI stabilization at anode surface. It has been demonstrated that the electrolytes based on organic carbonates commonly employed in Li-ion batteries (i.e. PC, EC, DEC and mixtures of them) are not compatible with the chemistry of LiS batteries. Long-chain polysulfides undergo nucleophilic attack on electrophilic sites of carbonates, resulting in the irreversible formation of by-products as ethanol, methanol, ethylene glycol and thiocarbonates. In LiS batteries are conventionally employed cyclic ethers (as DOL) or short-chain ethers (as DME) as well as the family of glycol ethers, including DEGDME and TEGDME. One common electrolyte is 1M LiTFSI in DOL:DME 1:1 vol. with1%w/w di LiNO3 as additive for lithium surface passivation.

Safety
Because of the high potential energy density and the nonlinear discharge and charging response of the cell, a microcontroller and other safety circuitry is sometimes used along with voltage regulators to manage cell operation and prevent rapid discharge.

Research

Commercialization
As of 2021 few companies had been able to commercialize the technology on an industrial scale. Companies such as Sion Power have partnered with Airbus Defence and Space to test their lithium sulfur battery technology. Airbus Defense and Space successfully launched their prototype High Altitude Pseudo-Satellite (HAPS) aircraft powered by solar energy during the day and by lithium sulfur batteries at night in real life conditions during an 11-day flight.  The batteries used in the test flight utilized Sion Power's LiS cells that provide 350 W⋅h/kg. Sion originally claimed to be in the process of volume manufacturing with availability by end of 2017; however more recently it can be seen that they have dropped work on their lithium sulfur battery in favor of a lithium-metal battery.

British firm OXIS Energy developed prototype lithium sulfur batteries.  Together with Imperial College London and Cranfield University, they published equivalent-circuit-network models for its cells. With Lithium Balance of Denmark they built a prototype scooter battery system primarily for the Chinese market, which had a capacity of 1.2kWh using 10Ah Long Life cells, and weighed 60% less than lead acid batteries with a significant increase in range.  They also built a 3U, 3,000W⋅h Rack-Mounted Battery that weighed only 25kg and was said to be fully scalable.  They claimed their Lithium-Sulfur batteries would cost about $200/kWh in mass production.  However, the firm entered bankruptcy (insolvency) status in May 2021.

Sony, which also commercialized the first lithium-ion battery, planned to introduce lithium–sulfur batteries to the market in 2020, but has provided no updates since the initial announcement in 2015.

Monash University's Department of Mechanical and Aerospace Engineering in Melbourne, Australia  developed an ultra-high capacity Li-S battery that has been manufactured by partners at the Fraunhofer Institute for Material and Beam Technology in Germany. It is claimed the battery can provide power to a smartphone for five days.

In 2022, the German company Theion claimed to introduce lithium–sulfur batteries for mobile devices in 2023 and for vehicles by 2024.

See also 

 List of battery types

References

External links

"EEMB Battery". EEMB Battery. Retrieved 2018-04-13.

Rechargeable batteries
Metal-sulfur batteries
Lithium-ion batteries